Bani Al Harith District ( Mudayrīyah Bani Al Ḥarith) is a district of the Amanat Al Asimah Governorate, Yemen founded by a sub-clan of Banu Harith. As of 2003, the district had a population of 184,509 inhabitants.

References

There are many Villegas in Bany alhareth such as  Al Rawdah, Bany Garmooz, Jadder, Al Hadood, and they are divided to around 50 small villages or region called Bait Alhobele, bait Humran, bait Molgad, bait Allan, bait Ateef, bait alhelale, bait Sadaan, bait Handel, Bait dongeesh, bait hankel, bait alhedmah, Al Arroq, Alhareh, bait ale boar, alhataresh, sareef

Districts of Amanat Al Asimah Governorate